Gmelina asiatica is a plant species, described by Linnaeus, in the family Lamiaceae (but previously placed on the Verbenaceae).  No subspecies are listed in the Catalogue of Life.

Gallery

References

External links 

asiatica
Flora of Indo-China